A continuous tone image (contone for short, or CT even shorter) is one where each color at any point in the image is reproduced as a single tone, and not as discrete halftones, such as one single color for monochromatic prints, or a combination of halftones for color prints.

The most common continuous tone images are film photographs (digital latitude is not continuous!) Also see film latitude. Every single dot of which can take a continuous range of colors depending on the quantity of captured radiance. On the other hand, at a microscopic level, developed black-and-white photographic film consists of only two colors, and not an infinite range of continuous tones. For details, see film grain. 

An example of a continuous-tone device is a CRT computer screen. Here, any pixel can represent any color, because the color components of the pixel are analog and can vary in infinite steps, and hence do not need halftones to make the colors. Of course, because the computer is a digital device, it cannot provide the CRT with infinite tone variations. In 24-bit color mode, it provides the monitor with 256 discrete steps for each channel (red, green, and blue), for a total of 16,777,216 (2563) discrete colors. A purely analog video signal (one that has not been manipulated by a computer of any kind) can provide infinite tone variations inside its own gamut.

A halftone device, in contrast, uses discrete dots of color, which at a certain distance look closely like the intended color. Examples of this are inkjet printers. Magazines and most printed material also use this technique to create the colors.

See also
Halftone

Printing terminology